There are much more to know about the ancient and historical places in this area.

It is 14 km east of Baranabad, and is the administrative seat of Zendeh Jan District. The population is 10,418 (est. 2007). Overlooking the town is the Seyyed Mohammad Khan fort (built after 1863) about 2 km to the southeast.

This district is one of the most beautiful and peaceful areas of Herat City. Fushanj is the old name of this area, but now the people name this area Zendejan (the only survival). There are many old and ancient histories about this name, but the most famous one relate to the time when Genghis Khan attacked to this ancient city, killed all and no one was remain except one. And later as the result, the other people called this area Zendejan which mean the only survival.  

Zendejan has about 70 thousand people, including 157 villages. There are 22 schools in the district, including 3 female and 4 male high schools with a total of 17,000 students which 7,000 students are girls, and all the people in this district speak Farsi/Dari. 

Most of the people in this district are farmers. Wheat and grain, besides there are plenty of fruits such as apples, pear, grapes, figs, peanuts, berries, in their gardens. Recently; most of the people grow Saffron, and Saffron of this area is known as the best Saffron in the world. Also silk industry of this area is one of other important skills these people have.

See also
Herat Province

Notes

Populated places in Herat Province